Robert D. Bailey may refer to:

 Robert D. Bailey Sr. (1883–1963), American judge involved in the Matewan Massacre trials
 Robert D. Bailey Jr. (1912–1994), West Virginia Secretary of State

See also
 Robert Bailey (disambiguation)
 R. D. Bailey Lake, formed by a dam on the Guyandotte River and named after Robert D. Bailey, Sr.